Napoleon and Samantha is a 1972 American adventure drama film directed by Bernard McEveety and written by Stewart Raffill. Filmed in and around John Day, Oregon, it stars Johnny Whitaker and Jodie Foster (in her feature film debut) in the title roles.

Plot
Eleven-year-old Napoleon lives with his grandfather. He and his grandfather adopt a lion named Major when by chance they meet an old clown who cannot take him back to Europe. The old lion has bad teeth and only drinks milk so they put Major in the chicken cage to look after him. When Napoleon's grandfather dies of old age, Napoleon asks a young grad student named Danny to help bury his grandfather. Uncertain about his future Napoleon runs off with the lion, a pet rooster, and his eight year old friend Samantha to try to find Danny, now a goat herder who lives in the mountains, and so Napoleon can avoid being sent to an orphanage.

Along their way, the two children encounter many dangers. Napoleon nearly falls off a cliff, but Major manages to pull him up with a rope. They have to cross a river which Major does not like, since most cats are afraid of water. A cougar attacks Napoleon's rooster, but Major easily defeats the much smaller cat and chases it up a tree. While Napoleon is out looking for wood he comes across an angry black bear that chases him back to where Samantha is resting with Major. At first, Major is too tired and wants to sleep while Samantha desperately tries to wake him. But as soon as the lion hears the roar of the bear, he stands up to challenge his opponent and protect the children. As the bear is much closer in size to Major than the cougar was, the two beasts fight hard but Major eventually gains the upper hand and the bear runs away.

Eventually the children find Danny's cabin and he takes them in with the hope of convincing Napoleon that orphanages really aren't that bad. Danny leaves the kids with a man named Mark Pierson and attempts to find Samantha's family to notify them, but he is arrested and accused of kidnapping the children. While at the police station, Danny notices a photo of Mark, who happens to be a dangerous psychopath and escapes to rescue them. He steals a motorcycle and the police chase him all the way back to his cabin where they find and arrest the wanted man.

When things are back to normal, Napoleon takes Major and tries to run away again to live with the Indians but Danny catches up. Danny explains that the Indians don't really live out in the wild anymore and that Napoleon should give foster care a try with a promise that Major could stay in the mountains and live with him. Napoleon agrees and they go back to Danny's cabin.

Cast

Johnny Whitaker as Napoleon Wilson
Jodie Foster as Samantha
Michael Douglas as Daniel Arlington Williams III
Will Geer as Grandpa Seth Wilson
Zamba as Major the Lion 
Arch Johnson as Chief of Police
Henry Jones as Mr. Amos Gutteridge
Vito Scotti as Dimitri the Clown
John Crawford as Desk Sergeant
Mary Wickes as Clerk
Ellen Corby as Gertrude
Rex Holman as Mark Pierson
Claude Johnson as Gary
John Lupton as Pete
James MacDonald as Bear, Major the Lion (Roaring)
John Ortega
Monty Margetts

Production
It was the second film written by Stewart Raffill, who was an animal supervisor-turned-writer-and-director. He sold the script to Disney and worked on the film as an animal supervisor and producer.

The film was largely shot in John Day, Oregon.
Foster was mauled by a substitute lion used on the film set and still has scars on her back and stomach (the same lion nearly mauled Bob Denver in the Gilligan's Island episode "Feed the Kitty"). "I was walking ahead of him. He was on an invisible leash, some piano wire. He got sick of me being slow, picked me up and held me sideways and shook me like a doll." "I was in shock and thought it was an earthquake. I turned around and saw the entire crew running off in the other direction. The trainer then said, 'Drop it' and he opened his mouth and dropped me." The incident left her with lifelong ailurophobia.

See also
 Alaxander, Julia (2023-11-14). "Disney+ launch lineup: every movie and TV show available to stream in the US on day one". The Verge. Retrieved 13 February 2023.
 List of American films of 1972

References

External links

 
 
 

1972 films
American adventure drama films
Fictional duos
Films about lions
Films adapted into comics
Films directed by Bernard McEveety Jr.
Films shot in Oregon
Films scored by Buddy Baker (composer)
Walt Disney Pictures films
Films produced by Winston Hibler
1970s English-language films
1970s American films